A list of notable Hakka people, belonging to the Han Chinese.

The list is based on patrilineality (ancestry on the paternal side regardless of maternal ancestry or the different degrees of ancestry) which the Chinese culture practises. In Chinese terms, it refers to one's dialect group. People whose maternal side are Hakka and who have publicly identified themselves as Hakka are included. The list also include descendants of overseas Hakkas who have inter-married with other ethnicities and other Han-Chinese groups. In both cases, information on their backgrounds are found under Description but is not complete.

Revolutionary, political and military leaders

China – Taiping Heavenly Kingdom

China – Qing dynasty

China – Republic of China

China – People's Republic

Taiwan

Hong Kong

Singapore

Malaysia

Indonesia

Thailand

Cambodia

Myanmar

Timor-Leste

Australia

French Polynesia

Mauritius

Seychelles

United Kingdom

France

Netherlands

United States

Guyana

Trinidad and Tobago

Suriname

Jamaica

Brazil

Government officials, academics, literary figures and others

China

Taiwan

Hong Kong

Singapore

Malaysia

Indonesia

United Arab Emirates

Mauritius

United Kingdom

United States

Canada

Entrepreneurs

China

Taiwan

Hong Kong

Macau

Singapore

Malaysia

Indonesia

South Africa

Thailand

India

United Kingdom

United States

Canada

Suriname

Sportspersons

China

Taiwan

Hong Kong

Malaysia

Indonesia

Netherlands

United States

Trinidad and Tobago

Actors, musicians and beauty queens

China

Taiwan

Hong Kong

Singapore

Malaysia

Indonesia

Japan

United Kingdom

United States

Jamaica

References

Hakka